Duisburg is a village in Flemish Brabant, Belgium. It should not be confused with the German city of Duisburg. Duisburg is a part of the municipality of Tervuren that is comprised by the villages of Duisburg, Tervuren, Vossem and Moorsel.

History
On 1 January 1977, Duisburg became part of the municipality of Tervuren after the fusion of Belgian municipalities. It had been an independent municipality.

Culture
There is a church dedicated to Saint Catherine, the Sint-Katharinakerk, in the centre of Duisburg.

Duisburg is also famous in the region for their annual hosting of the Hallocoween festival near the centre.

References

Populated places in Flemish Brabant
Tervuren